A bourne is an intermittent stream, flowing from a spring. Frequent in chalk and limestone country where the rock becomes saturated with winter rain, that slowly drains away until the rock becomes dry, when the stream ceases. The word is from the Anglo-Saxon language of England. 

The word can be found in northern England in placenames such as: Redbourne and Legbourne but is commonly in use in southern England (particularly Dorset) as a name for a small river, particularly in compound names such as winterbourne. A winterbourne is a stream or river that is dry through the summer months.

Bourne is used as a place name or as a part of a place name, usually in chalk downland countryside. Alternative forms are bourn or borne or born. The apparent variant, borne found in the placename: Camborne, arises from the Cornish language and is in fact a false friend: it refers to a hill (Cornish: bronn, from Common Brythonic *brunda; compare Welsh bryn). Born/borne in German also means fount, or spring, and is related to the Indo-European root, *bhreu.  That born/borne appears throughout Europe as a placename is also an important clue that this spelling is an etymological precursor to the Middle English bourne/burn.

Cf. Burn (landform), in common use in Scotland and North East England especially, but also found (in placenames) elsewhere in England such as: Blackburn, Gisburn, Woburn, Kilburn, Winkburn, and so forth.

For rivers and places named Bourne or having this word as part of the name, see Bourne (disambiguation).

References

Water streams
Fluvial landforms
Geomorphology
Hydrology
Rivers
Bodies of water